Leo is a given name in several languages. It can also refer to the name Leonard or Leopold. In Japanese, Leo or Reo (怜央) is usually a masculine given name.

The name can refer to:

People

Religious figures
 Leo of Constantinople (fl. 1134–1143), Patriarch of Constantinople
 Leo Rajendram Antony (1927–2012), 4th Bishop of Trincomalee
 Leo Baeck (1873–1956), German rabbi, scholar, and theologian
 Leo Zhedenov (1883–1959), member of the Russian apostolate
 Pope Leo (disambiguation), 13 popes
 List of saints named Leo

Rulers
 Emperor Leo (disambiguation), six Byzantine emperors
 King Leo (disambiguation), various kings and monarchs with the ruling name Leo
 Leo I, Prince of Armenia (died 1140)

Scientists
 Leo Kadanoff (1937–2015), American physicist
 Leó Szilárd (1898–1964), Jewish Hungarian-American physicist
 Reona Leo Esaki (born 1925), Japanese physicist and Nobel laureate

In sports

Association football
 Leo Beenhakker (born 1942), Dutch football manager
 Leo Bosschart (1888–1951), Dutch footballer
 Leo Fortune-West (born 1971), English footballer
Leo Krupnik (born 1979), Ukrainian-born American-Israeli former soccer player and current soccer coach
 Leo Messi (born 1987), Argentine footballer

Other sports
 Leo Baker (skateboarder) (born 1991), American skateboarder
 Leo Barry (born 1977), Australian rules footballer
 Leo Cantor (1919–1995), American NFL football player 
Leo Chenal (born 2000), American football player
 Leo Durocher (1905–1991), American baseball player and manager
 Leo Klein Gebbink (born 1968), Dutch field hockey player
 Leo Koloamatangi (born 1994), American football player
 Leo Komarov (born 1987), Finnish ice hockey player 
 Leo Mazzone (born 1948), pitching coach for the Atlanta Braves and the Baltimore Orioles
 Leo Monahan (journalist) (1926–2013), American sports journalist
 Leo Nomellini (1924–2000), American football player in both the College and Pro Football Halls of Fame
 Leo Peelen (1968–2017), Dutch track cyclist
 Leo Visser (born 1966), Dutch ice speed skater
 Leo van Vliet (born 1955), Dutch road bicycle racer

Artists and entertainers
 Leo Arnaud (1904–1991), French-American composer
 Leo de Berardinis (1940–2008), Italian stage actor and theatre director
 Leo de Bever (1930–2015), Dutch architect
 Leo G. Carroll (1886–1972), English actor
 Leo Chiosso (1920 - 2006), Italian lyricist
 Leo F. Forbstein (1892–1948), American film musical director and orchestra conductor
 Leo Gorcey (1917–1969), American actor
 Leo Howard (born 1997), American actor and martial artist
 Leo von König (1871–1944), German painter
 Leo Kottke (born 1945), American Finger-style Guitarist
 Leo Ku (born 1972), Hong Kong singer and actor
 Leo Rosten (1908–1997), American humorist
 Leo Saussay (born 1990), Thai actor and singer
 Leo Sayer (born 1948), British-born Australian pop musician
 Leo Tolstoy (1826–1910), Russian novelist

Politicians
 Leo von Caprivi (1831–1899), German general and Chancellor of Germany
 Leo Fernando (1895–1954), Sri Lankan Sinhala businessman, Member of Parliament for Buttala Electoral District
 Leo Ryan (1925–1978), California Congressman killed at Jonestown
 Leo Varadkar (born 1979), Irish politician and Tánaiste

Other
 Leo of Tripoli (died after 921/2), Greek renegade and admiral for the Abbasid Caliphate
 Leo Africanus (c. 1494–c. 1554?), Andalusian Berber Moorish diplomat and author
 Leo Burnett (1891–1971), American advertising executive
 Leo Fender (1909–1991), American inventor, maker of electric guitars
 Leo Frank (1884–1915), American Jew murdered by a lynch mob
 Leo Jogiches (1867–1919), Russian Marxist revolutionary
 Leo Krim (2010–2012), American child killed along with his sister Lucia by their nanny
 Leo Laporte (born 1956), American technology broadcaster and author
 A. Leo Levin (1919–2015), American law professor
 Leo Loudenslager (1944–1997), American world champion aerobatics aviator
 Leo Strauss (1899–1973), American political philosopher

Fictional characters
 Dr. Leo Marvin, a character played by Richard Dreyfuss in the 1991 American comedy movie What About Bob?
 Leo Beck, hunter in the video game Identity V
 Leo Tsukinaga, singer/songwriter from the franchise Ensemble Stars!
 Leo Corbett (Power Rangers), on the television series Power Rangers: Lost Galaxy
 Leo Demidov, character in “Child 44”
 Leo from the manga series, Pandora Hearts
 Leo Jones (Doctor Who), on the television series Doctor Who
 Leo Kliesen, a German spelunker in the Tekken series
 Leo Kovalensky, from the novel We the Living by Ayn Rand
 Leo McGarry, on the television series The West Wing
 Leo Fitz, on the television series Agents of S.H.I.E.L.D., played by Iain De Caestecker
 Leo Ross, a character in the 1989 American action comedy movie Speed Zone
 Leo, a nickname for Leonardo from Teenage Mutant Ninja Turtles
 Leo Wong, the father of Amy Wong on the television series Futurama
 Leo Valdez, a son of Hephaestus from Rick Riordan's The Heroes of Olympus fantasy novel series
 Leo Wyatt, on the television series Charmed
 Uncle Leo, on the television series Seinfeld
 Leo (That '70s Show), on the television series That '70s Show, played by Tommy Chong
 Leo (comics), in the Marvel universe
 Leo (Yu-Gi-Oh! 5D's), in the manga series Yu-Gi-Oh!
 A character in the video game series Tekken
 A character in the opera Leo, the Royal Cadet
 A character in the video game Final Fantasy VI
 A character in Red Earth (video game) (aka Warzard)
 Leo, in the American animated series Little Einsteins
 A character in the anime and manga series Fairy Tail, who also goes by the name of "Loke"
 A character in the video game Fire Emblem Fates
 Leo, a character in the Doubutsu Sentai Zyuohger
 Leo Lieberman, daughter of David "Micro" Lieberman and Sarah Lieberman in The Punisher, portrayed by Ripley Sobo
 Leo, one of the instructors in the video game Fitness Boxing 2: Rhythm and Exercise

See also
Léo
Leo (surname)
Leon (given name)

English-language unisex given names
English masculine given names
Hypocorisms
Masculine given names